Progress is a rural locality (a village) in Kamensky Selsoviet, Bizhbulyaksky District, Bashkortostan, Russia. The population was 13 as of 2010. There is 1 street.

Geography 
Progress is located 33 km southwest of Bizhbulyak (the district's administrative centre) by road. Vasilkino is the nearest rural locality.

References 

Rural localities in Bizhbulyaksky District